James Barbut, sometimes Jacques ( 1771 – 31 May 1791) was an English painter and naturalist.

[[Image:Barbut1781XXI.jpg|thumb|330px|left|Plate XXI from The genera insectorum of Linnæus exemplified in various specimens of English insects drawn from nature]]

Works
Barbut, J. 1781. The genera insectorum of Linnæus exemplified in various specimens of English insects drawn from nature. Les genres des insectes de Linné; constatés par divers échantillons d'insectes d'Angleterre, copiés d'après nature. London. (Dixwell).  
 Barbut, J. 1783. The genera vermium exemplified by various specimens of the animals contained in the orders of the Intestina et Mollusca Linnæi. Drawn from nature. London. (Dixwell).  
Barbut, J. 1788. The genera vermium of Linnæus part 2d. Exemplified by several of the rarest and most elegant subjects in the orders of the Testacea, Lithophyta, and Zoophyta Animalia, accurately drawn from nature. With explanations in English and French. London. (White).

References

Evenhuis, N. L., 1997 Litteratura taxonomica dipterorum (1758-1930). Volume 1 (A-K); Volume 2 (L-Z). Leiden, Backhuys Publishers 1; 2 : VII+1-426; 427-871
Damkaer, D. M., 2002 The Copepodologist's Cabinet. A Biographical and Bibliographical History.Philadelphia, American Philosophical Society : XIX+1-300, zahlr. Fig.
Lisney, A. A., 1960 A Bibliography of British Lepidoptera 1608-1799''.London.

External links

Works by James Barbut at AnimalBase  digitized literature

English entomologists

1770s births
1791 deaths

Year of birth uncertain
18th-century English painters
English naturalists
18th-century naturalists